The 1929 San Jose State Spartans football team represented State Teachers College at San Jose during the 1929 college football season.

San Jose State competed in the Far Western Conference (FWC) for the first time in 1929. They had previously been a member of the California Coast Conference (CCC) from 1922 to 1928. The team was led by first-year head coach Mush Crawford, and they played home games at Spartan Field in San Jose, California. The team finished the season with a record of three wins, three losses and one tie (3–3–1, 2–1–1 FWC). The Spartans outscored their opponents 104–78 for the season.

Schedule

Notes

References

San Jose State
San Jose State Spartans football seasons
San Jose State Spartans football